The Giralda is the name of a landmark in Kansas City, Missouri.

When urban developer J.C. Nichols visited Seville, Spain in the 1920s, he was so impressed with the 12th-century Moorish tower of Giralda that he built a half-scale replica in the Country Club Plaza. The tower was officially christened by then-Seville mayor Felix Morena de la Cova, along with an official delegate in 1967, the same year in which the two cities became sister cities. The original Giralda tower was the minaret of the 12th century Muslim mosque; a Christian belfry was added in 1568.

References

Buildings and structures in Kansas City, Missouri